Liam Christopher Coyle (born 6 December 1999) is an English professional footballer who plays for Accrington Stanley, as a midfielder.

Club career
Coyle began his career with Liverpool at the age of nine, and spent time on loan in Bolton Wanderers's development squad in 2021.

In July 2021 he signed for Accrington Stanley. His debut came on 5 October in a 5–0 win against Leicester City U21 in the EFL Trophy, whilst his league debut came on 13 November in a 1–4 defeat against Plymouth Argyle.

International career
Coyle was called up to the Northern Ireland U21 in March 2019.

Career statistics

References

1999 births
Living people
English footballers
Liverpool F.C. players
Bolton Wanderers F.C. players
Accrington Stanley F.C. players
Association football midfielders